Draško Stanivuković (born 21 May 1993) is a Bosnian Serb politician serving as mayor of Banja Luka since 2020. He is a member of the Party of Democratic Progress.

From 2018 until 2020, Stanivuković was a member of the National Assembly of Republika Srpska.

Early life
Stanivuković was born on 21 May 1993 in Banja Luka, Republika Srpska, Bosnia and Herzegovina, to one of the wealthiest families in the city. He finished middle and high school in his hometown. He is a student at the Faculty of Economics, University of Banja Luka and has been involved in politics since he was 18.

In 2014, Stanivuković founded the Association of Citizens "Be DIFFERENT", which aims to motivate young people and help others through various actions. So far, he has organized several protest walks and gatherings to point out the problems facing the citizens of Banja Luka, and also the whole of Bosnia and Herzegovina. They collected funds for arranging schoolyards, gymnasiums, helping people suffering from various diseases and more.

Political career

Early political career
In one interview, he admitted that he wanted to engage in socially useful work and politics since he was a child, and considering that his family is one of the wealthiest in Banja Luka, he stated that gaining money was not his motive for entering politics.

From 2016 to 2018, he was a member of the City Assembly of Banja Luka. He is the youngest elected member of the National Assembly of Republika Srpska. In the 2018 Bosnian general elections, he received the highest number of votes of all candidates for deputies individually.

That is why he was declared the "biggest surprise of the election" in some media, and even a "wunderkind", while the media close to the authorities gave him the epithet "young tycoon". His candidature was endorsed by a Serbian-Canadian movie director, Boris Malagurski. He has strongly criticized the Government of Republika Srpska, the Alliance of Independent Social Democrats (SNSD) and its president, and later the Serb member of the Presidency of Bosnia and Herzegovina, Milorad Dodik for their corruption. In one of the many videos he publishes on his Facebook page, where he has more than 124,000 followers, Stanivuković tears the newly laid asphalt with his hands in order to point out the quality of the works and that the contractors violate the rules according to which the thickness of the asphalt should be eight, not two centimeters.

During the first session after the formation of the City Assembly of Banja Luka, he stated that he waived the assembly member salary in the amount of 1000 BAM (574.42 USD) per month, and that he will distribute the funds every month to those who need it. During his tenure, he met with former UK Ambassador Edward Ferguson Austrian Chancellor Sebastian Kurz, and other senior officials. In March 2017, he attended the annual congress of the European People's Party in Malta. He also waived his salary as the Member of the National Assembly of Republika Srpska.

Stanivuković was arrested on 25 December 2018, during the "Justice for David" protest organized by a group of citizens, demanding that the authorities solve the case of the murder of a 21-year-old student David Dragičević. He and several other protesters were then accused of "calling for a violent change in the constitutional order of the Republika Srpska." He claims that during the arrest he was beaten on the genitalia by the police of Republika Srpska.

In October 2019, Stanivuković tried to pass The Law on Whistleblowers that is meant to protect the whistleblowers. Two months later, Stanivuković was slapped in the face by the Minister of Interior, Dragan Lukač after an argument during the session of the National Assembly. One day after, Stanivuković said that Milorad Dodik, the Serb member of the Presidency of Bosnia and Herzegovina threatened him and insulted his mother, posting a video on Twitter as the proof.

In February 2020, a photo of Stanivuković holding a Chetnik flag was leaked on social media, which caused outrage in the Bosniak and Croat public in which Stanivuković enjoyed a solid number of supporters. Not long after, in an interview with Face TV, Stanivuković stated that the International Criminal Tribunal for the former Yugoslavia is a political court. There was also talk about the protests in Montenegro, and Stanivuković denied the Montenegrin language and the Montenegrin Orthodox Church in the conversation. He also called Serbia his own country and said that it is natural that he loves it.

In May 2020, he entered and recorded the farm of Igor Dodik, the son of Milorad Dodik and explained in the video that by this act he wanted to show that the Dodik family became rich at the expense of the people and that he only showed a part of their wealth. Also in May 2020, Stanivuković filed a report with the Banja Luka District Public Prosecutor's Office against BiH Presidency member and SNSD leader Milorad Dodik, and Interior Minister Dragan Lukač for, as stated in the document, unauthorized wiretapping and audio recording after Dodik publicly said that he wiretaps the opposition. Stanivuković also filed a report against the Prime Minister of Republika Srpska, Radovan Višković, and the Minister of Health, Alen Šeranić, in the case of the procurement of a mobile hospital during the COVID-19 pandemic.

Stanivuković was arrested on 29 August 2020 in Nikšić, Montenegro after participating in the anti-government religious protest in support of the Serbian Orthodox Church together with a Montenegrin politician, Vladislav Dajković. Shortly after, he was released and deported from Montenegro. He was banned from entering Montenegro for a year.

On 1 November 2020, the Party of Democratic Progress announced that in the Banja Luka settlement of Kumsale, a man with a pointed gun approached the private car of Stanivuković looking for him. However, Stanivuković was not in the vehicle at that moment. They then headed for the Lazarevo police station, while the attacker followed them until they approached the station. The attacker was identified, detained and prosecuted.

Mayor of Banja Luka (2020–present)
On 5 July 2020, it was announced that Stanivuković would run for mayor of Banja Luka as a candidate of the Party of Democratic Progress in the 2020 Bosnian municipal elections. On 22 July 2020, Stanivuković signed an agreement with the Serb Democratic Party making him their candidate as well. President of the Serb Democratic Party, Mirko Šarović, called him a candidate "who knows what the city needs" and that he has a vision of the "European Banja Luka which Republika Srpska deserves as well".

On 15 November 2020, at the municipal elections, Stanivuković was elected mayor of Banja Luka. He assumed office a month later, on 24 December. At 27 years of age, Stanivuković became the youngest person to assume the role of mayor of Banja Luka.

In June 2021, he met with mayor of Sarajevo Benjamina Karić in Banja Luka, marking this event the first time after 26 years, and since the end of the Bosnian War, that the mayors of both Sarajevo and Banja Luka, as the two largest cities of Bosnia and Herzegovina, have met each other.

Personal life 

In December 2021, a sextape depicting a Party of Democratic Progress politician Ivan Begić appeared online, leading to Begić leaving the party and retiring from politics. The video insinuates that the other person in it is Stanivuković himself; however, Begić denied that.

References

External links

Draško Stanivuković's official Twitter account

1993 births
Living people
People from Banja Luka
Serbs of Bosnia and Herzegovina
University of Banja Luka alumni
Party of Democratic Progress politicians
Mayors of Banja Luka